The 1906 Men's World Weightlifting Championships were held in Lille, France, on March 18, 1906. There were 33 men in action from 4 nations. It was the 9th World Weightlifting Championships.

Medal summary

Medal table

References
Results
Weightlifting World Championships Seniors Statistics

External links
International Weightlifting Federation

World Weightlifting Championships
World Weightlifting Championships
World Weightlifting Championships
International weightlifting competitions hosted by France